The association football tournament at the 1956 Summer Olympics was won by the Soviet Union.

Background
Following five withdrawals, the tournament featured three Eastern bloc teams and four from Asia. The other sides included in the draw were the United States, the United Team of Germany (which was de facto West Germany), Great Britain and the hosts Australia, competing in their first Olympic football tournament.

The tendency of Eastern bloc countries to provide state-funding for their athletes put Western amateurs at a significant disadvantage. As a result, all Olympic football tournaments 1952 onwards were dominated by the Soviet Union and its satellites.

Venues

Final tournament

First round

Five of the sixteen qualified teams withdrew before the final draw:  (who boycotted the Games to protest the reception of Taiwan),  (who boycotted the Games to protest the Israeli, British and French invasion), and the recent World Cup runners-up , a nation that was cheered in other Olympic contests due to their ongoing suppression by Soviet troops.

Therefore, only three games were played in the first round: as China and Turkey had been drawn against each other, their match was scratched.

The Soviet Union defeated the United Team of Germany 2–1, Great Britain defeated Thailand 9–0, and Australia defeated Japan 2–0.

Quarter-finals
Yugoslavia defeated the United States 9–1.

Great Britain lost 6–1 to Bulgaria, and at half-time, ratings from HMS Newcastle vaulted the fence and exhorted the team to show more grit, after which they were peacefully escorted off the field.

The Soviets drew their game against Indonesia 0–0 and won 4–0 in the replay.

The Indians defeated Australia 4–2 with a hat trick by centre forward Neville D'Souza, the first by an Asian in the Olympics. Prior to the game there had been debate, once again, as to whether the Indians should be shod. Sir Stanley Rous respected their decision either way, although in the end, the Indians decided to wear boots. The Indonesian referee disallowed two first half goals. Bob Bignall the Australian captain was unable to get an intelligible reply out of him during the break.

Semi-finals
Yugoslavia defeated India 4–1. It would be their third consecutive Olympic final, after losing both in 1948 and 1952.

The Soviets defeated Bulgaria 2–1. Bulgaria scored first and conceded two goals in the last six minutes of the game.

Finals

Yugoslavia were playing Red Star Belgrade's Dragoslav Šekularac in this tournament; he would feature in the 1960 European Nations' Cup final. They lost 1–0 to a second half Anatoli Ilyin goal.

Bulgaria took Bronze defeating India 3–0.

Bronze Medal match

Gold Medal match

Bracket

Goalscorers

Medalists

See also
Association football at the 1956 Summer Olympics – Men's team squads
Association football at the 1956 Summer Olympics – Men's qualification

References

External links

Olympic Football Tournament Melbourne 1956, FIFA.com
RSSSF Archive

 
1956
1956 Summer Olympics events
1956